Robert Norman was a 16th-century-English mariner, compass builder, and hydrographer who discovered magnetic inclination, the deviation of the Earth's magnetic field from the vertical.

Work 

Robert Norman is noted for The Newe Attractive, a pamphlet published in 1581 describing the lodestone (magnet) and practical aspects of navigation. More importantly, it included Norman's measurement of magnetic dip, the incline at an angle from the horizon by a compass needle  discovered by Georg Hartmann in 1544. This effect is caused by the Earth's magnetic field not running parallel to the planet's surface.  Norman demonstrated magnetic dip by creating a compass needle that pivoted on a horizontal axis. The needle tilted at a steep angle relative to the horizon line.

Magnetic inclination and local variations were known before Robert Norman, but his pamphlet had a greater influence than the earlier work.

The crater Norman on the Moon is named in his honour.

Writings

See also 
 William Gilbert
 History of geomagnetism
 List of geophysicists
 Shen Kuo, discoverer of magnetic declination

References 

English sailors
English geophysicists
English hydrographers
Year of birth missing
Year of death missing
British scientific instrument makers
16th-century English writers
16th-century male writers